Flying Turns is the name of a specific model of bobsled roller coaster.  John Norman Bartlett, a British aviator in World War I, came to North America after the war with an idea for a trackless wooden chute, full of twists like a bobsled course, with toboggan-like cars, based on a bobsled ride that operated in Europe. He had filed GB Patent 279109A for the idea in 1926.  Bartlett met John Miller in 1928, and they commenced building the new ride. When the ride went into production, much of the idea was the same, but the cars looks more like monoplanes, which Bartlett designed. Miller worked on the loading station, supporting structure, braking system and incline.

Both the bobsled coaster and the flying turns coaster are buildable in the RollerCoaster Tycoon and Thrillville series of video games.

Flying Turns installations

References

Bobsled roller coasters